St. John Brebeuf Regional Secondary is a Catholic school, under the administration of the Catholic Independent Schools Vancouver Archdiocese school board.

The school is co-educational, offering academic, fine arts, and business programs, as well as athletic, performing arts, and other extracurricular programs, for students from grades 8 to 12.

History 
Saint John Brebeuf Regional Secondary is the first Catholic high school in the central Fraser Valley. The school began with Grade 8 in a portable classroom in September 1992 and now has over 400 students.

Feeder parishes are St Ann's Abbotsford, Sts. Joachim & Ann's Aldergrove, St. James Clearbrook, St. Joseph's Langley, St. Joseph's Mission, and St. Mary's Chilliwack.

Independent school status 

St. John Brebeuf Regional Secondary is classified as a Group 1 school under British Columbia's Independent School Act. It receives 50% funding from the Ministry of Education. The school receives no funding for capital costs. It is under charge of the Roman Catholic Archdiocese of Vancouver.

Academic performance 

In 2018, the Fraser Institute ranked  St. John Brebeuf Regional Secondary as 236th out of 251 British Columbia high schools.

Athletic performance 

St. John Brebeuf fields teams in basketball, volleyball, golf, soccer, tennis, track and field, and cross country.

In the 2008–2009 school year, the senior boys soccer team won the Single "A" Provincials that the school hosted. That year, the girls soccer team finished third in the Single "A" Provincials at Nakusp.

Artistic performance 

Music
In the years 2007-2010 St John Brebeuf's Jazz Band led by Robert Woitowich, has won Gold status in the Kwantlen Jazz Festival.

References

External links 
 

Catholic secondary schools in British Columbia
High schools in Abbotsford, British Columbia
Educational institutions established in 1992
1992 establishments in British Columbia